Lithocarpus confragosus is a tree in the beech family Fagaceae. The specific epithet  is from the Latin meaning "uneven", referring to the cupule wall surface.

Description
The brownish bark is smooth, scaly or lenticellate.

Distribution and habitat
Lithocarpus confragosus grows naturally in Sumatra, Peninsular Malaysia and Borneo. Its habitat is hill dipterocarp forests up to  altitude.

References

confragosus
Trees of Sumatra
Trees of Peninsular Malaysia
Trees of Borneo
Plants described in 1888